Tang Xin (born 16 October 1990) is a Chinese footballer who currently plays for Chengdu Rongcheng as a right-footed left-back in the Chinese Super League.

Club career
Tang Xin joined Beijing Guoan's youth academy at the age of twelve along with twin younger brother Tang Miao in 2002. He was registered with China League Two side Liaoning Zhongba for the 2006 season. He was loaned to Beijing Guoan's satellite team Beijing Guoan Talent, which would play as a foreign team in Singapore's S. League in the 2010 season. Tang was on the bench for most time of the season. On 27 September 2010, he made his senior debut against Gombak United, coming on for Li Tixiang in the half time, as the result that some Beijing players was banned for participating a brawl in a league match against Young Lions. Tang scored his first goal in the match, which resulted in a 1–1 draw. He was released by Beijing Guoan at the end of the season.

Tang joined China League Two side Jiangxi Liansheng in 2012 after he recovered from ankle surgery. He transferred to fellow League Two club Qinghai Senke in 2013. Tang received a trial with Guangzhou R&F at the recommendation of Tang Miao, whom played as a regular right-back at the club, and joined R&F's reserved team in 2014.

Tang transferred to China League One side Guizhou Hengfeng Zhicheng in 2016. He made his debut for Guizhou on 19 March 2016 in a 3–1 away defeat against Qingdao Huanghai. He played 23 matches in the 2016 season as Guizhou Zhicheng finished the runners-up of the league and won promotion to Chinese Super League. On 28 April 2017, he made his Super League debut in a 3–1 away victory against Guangzhou R&F, contesting with Tang Miao. The match marked the first time twin brothers had played for opposing teams in the Chinese Super League.

After having spent five seasons at Guizhou and playing over 100 games for them, Tang would join Chengdu Rongcheng on 12 April 2021 on a free transfer. He made his debut for the club in a league game on 21 September 2021 against Beijing Institute of Technology in a 2-0 victory. He would establish himself as a regular within the team and aid the club to promotion to the top tier at the end of the 2021 league campaign.

Career statistics
.

References

External links

1990 births
Living people
Chinese footballers
Footballers from Dalian
Jiangxi Beidamen F.C. players
Guizhou F.C. players
Singapore Premier League players
Chinese Super League players
China League One players
China League Two players
China international footballers
Association football midfielders
Twin sportspeople
Chinese twins